Standings and results for Group 8 of the UEFA Euro 2004 qualifying tournament.

Group 8 consisted of Andorra, Belgium, Bulgaria, Croatia and Estonia. Group winners were Bulgaria. Croatia and Belgium finished equal on points in for second place, however Croatia qualified for the play-offs due to goal difference in their head-to-head records.

Standings

Matches

Goalscorers

References
RSSSF Page

Group 8
2002–03 in Bulgarian football
2003–04 in Bulgarian football
2002–03 in Croatian football
2003–04 in Croatian football
2002–03 in Belgian football
2003–04 in Belgian football
2002–03 in Andorran football
2003–04 in Andorran football
2002 in Estonian football
2003 in Estonian football
Bulgaria at UEFA Euro 2004
Croatia at UEFA Euro 2004